Lanrivain is a commune in the Côtes-d'Armor department of Brittany in northwestern France.

Population

Inhabitants of Lanrivain are called lanrivanais in French.

See also
Communes of the Côtes-d'Armor department
List of the works of the Maître de Lanrivain

References

External links

Communes of Côtes-d'Armor